The curb cut effect is the phenomenon of disability-friendly features being used and appreciated by a larger group than the people they were designed for. For example, many hearing people use closed captioning. With wide use, accessibility is a boon to all people. The phenomenon is named for curb cuts miniature ramps comprising parts of sidewalk which were first made for wheelchair access in particular places, but are now universal and no longer widely recognized as a disability-accessibility feature.

See also
Universal design

References

Assistive technology
Disability rights